This was the first edition of the tournament.

Andrea Petkovic won her first title since 2015, defeating Mayar Sherif in the final, 6–1, 6–1. Sherif become the first Egyptian player to be in the final of WTA Tour tournament.

Seeds

Draw

Finals

Top half

Bottom half

Qualifying

Seeds

Qualifiers

Qualifying draw

First qualifier

Second qualifier

Third qualifier

Fourth qualifier

Fifth qualifier

Sixth qualifier

References

External Links
Main Draw
Qualifying Draw

Winners Open - Singles